Raimo Lindholm (17 November 1931 – 20 November 2017) was a Finnish basketball player. He competed in the men's tournament at the 1952 Summer Olympics and the 1964 Summer Olympics, the only Finnish basketball player to do so. He was the first player to earn more than 100 caps for the Finland national basketball team.

References

1931 births
2017 deaths
Finnish men's basketball players
Olympic basketball players of Finland
Basketball players at the 1952 Summer Olympics
Basketball players at the 1964 Summer Olympics
Sportspeople from Helsinki